Satilatlas is a genus of sheet weavers that was first described by Eugen von Keyserling in 1886.

Species
 it contains eight species and one subspecies, found in Europe, Russia, the United States, Canada, and Alaska:
Satilatlas arenarius (Emerton, 1911) – USA, Canada
Satilatlas britteni (Jackson, 1913) – Europe
Satilatlas carens Millidge, 1981 – Canada
Satilatlas gentilis Millidge, 1981 – USA
Satilatlas gertschi Millidge, 1981 – Canada
Satilatlas insolens Millidge, 1981 – USA
Satilatlas marxi Keyserling, 1886 (type) – Russia, USA (Alaska), Canada
Satilatlas m. matanuskae (Chamberlin, 1949) – USA (Alaska)
Satilatlas monticola Millidge, 1981 – USA, Canada

See also
 List of Linyphiidae species (Q–Z)

References

Araneomorphae genera
Linyphiidae
Spiders of North America
Spiders of Russia
Taxa named by Eugen von Keyserling